Graceville is a city in Jackson County, Florida, United States. It is near the Alabama state line. The population was 2,278 at the 2010 census. A large portion of Graceville's rural acreage is located in Holmes County, Florida, United States.

Geography

The City of Graceville is located at  (30.959044, −85.513280).

Land area:                  . 
Region of the country:      Southeast  
Average temperature:        67.2  
Average high temperature:   79.0  
Average low temperature:    55.0 
Annual rain:                66.0 inches 
Annual snowfall:            0.0 inches 
Earthquake index:           0.0

Graceville is one of the only areas in the state of Florida that is divided into two counties. The city limits are located inside Jackson County while a majority of its rural acreage is located inside Holmes County.

Florida State Roads 2 and 77 are the two main highways through the city. FL-2 runs from west to east through the center of town, leading east  to Campbellton and west  to Esto. FL-77 runs from south to north through the center of town, leading northeast  to Dothan, Alabama via a connection with Alabama State Route 109, and south  to Chipley.

Jackson County is a rural community primarily composed of business in agriculture, manufacturing, service, and retail trade. In addition, many government facilities are located within the county, including a federal prison and three state correctional institutions.

Soil composition ranges from sandy to clay base. The most typical soil is sandy loam. Jackson County has a vast deposit of nearly pure limestone. The county abounds in lakes including Lake Seminole, Compass Lake, Merritt's Mill Pond and Ocheessee Pond. The Chattahoochee River-Apalachicola River, which is navigable and has a nine-foot channel depth, forms the county's eastern border. The Chipola River flows south through the center of the county.

It is the fifth-smallest county in Florida by total area.

Demographics

2020 census
Note: the US Census treats Hispanic/Latino as an ethnic category. This table excludes Latinos from the racial categories and assigns them to a separate category. Hispanics/Latinos can be of any race. 

As of the 2020 United States census, there were 2,153 people, 817 households, and 522 families residing in the city.

2000 census
As of the census of 2000, there were 2,402 people, 933 households, and 572 families residing in the city. The racial makeup of the city was 73.48% White, 23.90% African American, 0.92% Native American, 0.17% Asian, 0.25% from other races, and 1.29% from two or more races. Hispanic or Latino of any race were 1.46% of the population.

There were 933 households, out of which 26.8% had children under the age of 18 living with them, 44.3% were married couples living together, 13.8% had a female householder with no husband present, and 38.6% were non-families. 33.9% of all households were made up of individuals, and 17.3% had someone living alone who was 65 years of age or older. The average household size was 2.35 and the average family size was 3.08.

In the city, the population was spread out, with 23.4% under the age of 18, 13.3% from 18 to 24, 23.1% from 25 to 44, 19.7% from 45 to 64, and 20.6% who were 65 years of age or older. The median age was 37 years. For every 100 females, there were 84.3 males. For every 100 females age 18 and over, there were 80.0 males.

The median income for a household in the city was $23,031, and the median income for a family was $32,778. Males had a median income of $25,969 versus $20,109 for females. The per capita income for the city was $14,245. About 15.1% of families and 20.7% of the population were below the poverty line, including 25.0% of those under age 18 and 18.9% of those age 65 or over.

Education
Graceville Elementary School
Graceville High School
Poplar Springs High School
Baptist College of Florida

Notable people
 Neal Anderson, former professional football player
 John Wayne Mixson, former lieutenant Governor of Florida, former Governor of Florida
 Ricky Polston, Chief Justice of the Florida Supreme Court
 Bob Snyder (musician)
 Colston Weatherington, Former professional football player

Transportation
Graceville was served by the Louisville and Nashville Railroad at the end of the stub Georgiana Branch which reached the town on July 16, 1902, and, later, by the Seaboard System from 1983, and then by the Alabama and Florida Railroad, when the line was spun off as a shortline. The line was freight-only, the last L&N passenger local having come off circa late 1950. Train 27 departed Georgiana, Alabama, at 7:15 a.m., arriving at Graceville at 10:40 a.m. Returning train 28 departed Graceville at 11:05 a.m. and arrived at Georgiana at 2:35 p.m. Following World War II, with the improvement of local roads and the availability of private vehicles, the railroad petitioned the Alabama Public Service Commission to discontinue daily except Sunday trains between Georgiana and Graceville on November 6, 1947. "Passenger travel on trains 27 and 28 is now, and has been for several years, at a very low ebb, there being times when the train crew exceeds the number of passengers on the train," explained the railroad company in court documents dated October 31, 1950, appealing the commission's refusal to allow discontinuance. The operating deficit averaged ~$188 per day.

The A&F abandoned the line between Geneva and Graceville on January 16, 1984. The Atlanta and St. Andrews Bay Railroad also built a seven-mile connection into town from the east from their Dothan-Panama City mainline at Campbellton, completed July 14, 1971, but this, too, was abandoned by 1996 after the possible bridge traffic from the A&F disappeared. The "Bay Line" would buy the small yard and wye in town from the A&F. Only a few rails embedded in former town grade crossings mark the abandoned right of ways.

References

Cities in Jackson County, Florida
Cities in Florida